The Collier Springs Picnic Area is located on Forest Road 177 in Ouachita National Forest, northeast of Norman, Arkansas.  The picnic area is notable for the presence of the Collier Springs Shelter, which was built by crews of the Civilian Conservation Corps in 1939.  It is a rectangular open-air stone structure, with stone columns topped by hewn log beams that support the gabled roof.  The shelter also acts as a protective cover for the eponymous spring, which is fed via a pipe to the nearby creek.  Facilities at the picnic area also include a vault toilet.

See also
National Register of Historic Places listings in Montgomery County, Arkansas

References

Park buildings and structures on the National Register of Historic Places in Arkansas
Government buildings completed in 1939
Ouachita National Forest
Civilian Conservation Corps in Arkansas
National Register of Historic Places in Montgomery County, Arkansas
1939 establishments in Arkansas
Rustic architecture in Arkansas
Picnic shelters